Newton most commonly refers to:
 Isaac Newton (1642–1726/1727), English scientist
 Newton (unit), SI unit of force named after Isaac Newton

Newton may also refer to:

Arts and entertainment
 Newton (film), a 2017 Indian film
 Newton (band), Spanish electronic music group
 Newton (Blake), a print by William Blake
 Newton (Paolozzi), a 1995 bronze sculpture by Eduardo Paolozzi
 Cecil Newton (Coronation Street), a character in the British soap opera Coronation Street
 Curtis Newton, "real" name of pulp magazine character Captain Future
 George Newton, a character in the film series Beethoven
 Newton Gearloose, a Disney character, nephew of Gyro Gearloose
 Newton, a character in The Mighty Hercules animated series

People
 Newton (surname), including a list of people with the surname
 Newton (given name), including a list of people with the given name

Places

Australia
 Newton, South Australia

Canada
 Newton, Edmonton, Alberta
 Newton, Surrey, British Columbia

New Zealand
 Newton, New Zealand
 Newton (New Zealand electorate), a 19th-century parliamentary constituency in Auckland

Singapore
 Newton, Singapore

United Kingdom
 List of places called Newton in the United Kingdom

United States
 Newton, Alabama
 Newton County, Arkansas
 Newton, Georgia
 Newton County, Georgia
 Newton, Illinois
 Newton, Indiana
 Newton County, Indiana
 Newton, Wabash County, Indiana
 Newton, Iowa
 Newton, Kansas
 Newton, Massachusetts
 Newton, Mississippi
 Newton County, Mississippi
 Newton County, Missouri
 Newton, New Hampshire
 Newton, New Jersey
 Newton, North Carolina
 Newton, Texas
 Newton County, Texas
 Newton, Utah
 Newton, Washington
 Newton, Wisconsin (disambiguation)
 Newton Township (disambiguation)

Science and technology

Astronomy
 8000 Isaac Newton, a minor planet
 Newton (lunar crater)
 Newton (Martian crater)
 XMM-Newton, an orbiting X-ray observatory

Computing
 Apple Newton, a series of personal digital assistants by Apple Computer, Inc.
 Newton OS, an operating system for the Apple Newton
 Newton (app), an email management application developed by CloudMagic, Inc.
 Newton Game Dynamics, a free physics engine for simulating rigid bodies in games

Other uses in science
 Newton scale, temperature scale devised by Isaac Newton

Other uses
 Hurricane Newton, various tropical cyclones
 Newton Station (disambiguation)
 Newton Vineyard, a wine estate in California, United States
 Newtons (cookie), most prominently Fig Newtons, a Nabisco version of the fig roll

See also
 New Town (disambiguation)
 Newtown (disambiguation)
 Newtonville (disambiguation)
 The Newton Letter by John Banville, first published in 1982